Scroby Sands is a sandbank or shoal, off the coast of Norfolk, England which runs near shore, north to south from Caister south towards Great Yarmouth.  It has been the site of many shipwrecks. This location is also notable for an offshore 60MW wind farm opened in 2003.

Description 
Scroby sands is frequently shown on charts as having three components, named North Scroby, Middle Scroby and South Scroby.

It comprises a large group of shoals with Scroby Sands itself being the largest near shore sandbank in the group. It is deeper and narrower at its northern end and shallower and broader at its southern end.

Wind farm
The sands are now clearly marked by the Wind turbines  of Scroby Sands wind farm which were erected in 2003–4. The farm was commissioned by Powergen Renewables Offshore, a division of one of the UK's major electricity producing companies (now called E.ON UK), and is expected to produce up to a maximum of 60 megawatts of power, enough for 41,000 homes.

Ships wrecked on Scroby Sands
Some of the ships wrecked here include:
Durham Packet of Stockton wrecked on 6 December 1847
SS Douglas wrecked after collision with SS Sinloo on Cross sands on 28 January 1905
SS Sinloo wrecked after collision with SS Douglas (see above)
SS Eastward stranded then wrecked 25 March 1918
SS Hopelyn wrecked on 17 October 1922.
Sequena wrecked October 1995
 Steamer Sea Queen wrecked 13 February 1870

See also
Haisborough Sands
Hammond's Knoll

References

Sandbanks of the North Sea
Coastal features of Norfolk
Landforms of Norfolk
Sandbanks of England